Manuel de Paiva Boléo (26 March 1904 in Idanha-a-Nova – 1 November 1992 in Coimbra, Portugal) was a professor of Romance philology and Portuguese linguistics.

Biography

External links
Biography - in Portuguese

Portuguese philologists
1904 births
1992 deaths
People from Idanha-a-Nova
20th-century philologists